Short track speed skating at the Vancouver 2010 Olympics was held at the Pacific Coliseum, Vancouver, British Columbia on 13–26 February 2010.

China dominated the competition, sweeping the women's events - winning gold in the 500 m, 1,000 m 1,500 m and 3000 m relay. Wang Meng won three gold medals becoming the most accomplished female short track speed skater in Olympic history and Apolo Ohno became the most decorated Winter Olympian in US history with 8 medals.

Haralds Silovs of Latvia became the first athlete in Olympic history to participate in both short track (1500m) and long track (5000m) speed skating, and the first to compete in two different disciplines on the same day. He competed in the 5000m and then raced across town to the 1500m event.

Competition schedule
All times are Pacific Standard Time (UTC-8).

Medal summary

Medal table

Men's events

Women's events

Records

Participating nations
The quotas were announced on November 23, 2009.

References

External links
 Qualification system
 Vancouver 2010 Olympic Winter Games Competition Schedule v12 
 

 
2010
2010 Winter Olympics events
Olympics, 2010